Luca Covili (born 10 February 1997) is an Italian racing cyclist, who currently rides for UCI ProTeam . In May 2019, he was named in the startlist for the 2019 Giro d'Italia.

Major results
2017
 6th Overall Giro della Valle d'Aosta
2018
 8th Overall Toscana-Terra di Ciclismo
2021
 7th Overall Adriatica Ionica Race
 6th Overall Czech Cycling Tour
 8th Grand Prix Alanya
 8th Grand Prix Velo Alanya
2022
 4th Overall Adriatica Ionica Race
 9th Overall Czech Cycling Tour

Grand Tour general classification results timeline

References

External links
 

1997 births
Living people
Italian male cyclists
Sportspeople from the Province of Modena
Cyclists from Emilia-Romagna